Jacques-Victor-Albert, 4th duc de Broglie (13 June 182119 January 1901) was a French monarchist politician, diplomat and writer (of historical works and translations).

Broglie twice served as Prime Minister of France, first from May 1873 to May 1874, and again from May to November 1877.

Biography
Albert de Broglie was born in Paris, France, the eldest son of Victor, 3rd duc de Broglie, a liberal statesman of the July Monarchy, and Albertine, baroness Staël von Holstein, the fourth child of Madame de Staël. He was therefore the great-grandson of Jacques Necker.

After a brief diplomatic career at Madrid and Rome, upon the revolution of 1848 Albert de Broglie withdrew from public life and devoted himself to literature. He had already published a translation of the religious system of Leibniz (1846). He now at once made his mark by his contributions to the Revue des deux mondes and the Orleanist and clerical organ . These, and other contributions, brought him the succession to Lacordaire's seat in the Académie française in 1862, joining his father in this august society.

In 1870 he succeeded his father as the 4th duc de Broglie, having previously been styled prince de Broglie. In the following year he was elected to the National Assembly for the département of the Eure, and a few days later (on 19 February) was appointed French Ambassador to London. After his negotiations concerning the commercial treaties between Britain and France were met with criticism he resigned as ambassador in March 1872 and took his seat in the Assembly, where he became the leader of the royalist campaign against President Thiers.

When Thiers was replaced by Marshal Mac-Mahon, Broglie was appointed Prime Minister and Foreign Minister in May 1873. On 26 November, after the passing of the Septennate, the government was restructured and Broglie exchanged the Foreign with the Interior Ministry. His conservative policies roused the bitter hatred of the Republicans, while his attempts to reach a compromise between the rival claimants to the monarchy alienated both the Legitimist and the Bonapartists.

The result was the fall of the cabinet on 16 May 1874. Three years later (on 16 May 1877) he was entrusted with the formation of a new Cabinet, with the object of appealing to the country and securing a conservative majority in the chamber. While the conservatives increased their share of the vote, the election nevertheless confirmed a decisive Republican majority. De Broglie was defeated in his own constituency and resigned on 20 November.

Defeated again in 1885, he abandoned politics and reverted to his historical work, publishing a series of historical studies and biographies. He died in Paris on 19 January 1901, aged 79.

1st Ministry (25 May – 26 November 1873)

2nd Ministry (26 November 1873 – 22 May 1874)

3rd Ministry (17 May – 23 November 1877)

Bibliography
De Broglie edited:
The Souvenirs of his father (1886, etc.)
The Mémoires de Talleyrand (1891, etc.)
Letters of the Duchess Albertine de Broglie (1896)

He published:
 (1878)
Frédéric II et Marie Thérèse (1883)
Frédéric II et Louis XV (1885)
Marie Thérèse Impératrice (1888)
Le Père Lacordaire (1889)
Maurice de Saxe et le marquis d'Argenson (1891)
La Paix d'Aix-la-Chapelle (1892)
L'Alliance autrichienne (1895)
La Mission de M. de Gontaut-Biron à Berlin (1896)
Voltaire avant et pendant la Guerre de Sept Ans (1898)
Saint Ambroise (trans., Margaret Maitland in the series, The Saints) (1899)

Family

On 18 June 1845, styled Prince de Broglie, he married Joséphine-Eléonore-Marie-Pauline de Galard de Brassac de Béarn (1825–1860).

They had the following children:
 Louis-Alphonse-Victor, 5th duc de Broglie (1846 – 1906) father of the scientist brothers including the 7th Duke, the Nobel Laureate.
 Maurice (1848 – 1862)
 Henri-Amédée (1849 – 1917)
 François-Marie-Albert (1851 – 1939) great-grandfather of the 8th duke, Victor-François, 8th duc de Broglie (1949 – 2012).
 César-Paul-Emmanuel (1854 – 1926)

Honours and titles 
  Duke of France (succeeded as 4th Duke of Broglie 1870)
  Chevalier, Légion d'honneur (1845)

Notes

References

Attribution

Further reading

External links
 www.academie-francaise.fr
 
 

1821 births
1901 deaths
Politicians from Paris
Albert
Albert
Orléanists
Prime Ministers of France
French interior ministers
Government ministers of France
Members of the National Assembly (1871)
French Senators of the Third Republic
Senators of Eure
Members of the Ligue de la patrie française
19th-century French historians
Members of the Académie Française
Members of the Académie des sciences morales et politiques
Chevaliers of the Légion d'honneur